WKXA-FM (100.5 FM) is a radio station licensed to Findlay, Ohio, United States. The station is currently owned by Blanchard River Broadcasting Company, a division of the Findlay Publishing Company.

History 
The station began as WFIN-FM and in 1975 changed to country-formatted WHMQ.  In June 1989 the call letters became WKXA . Since the station adopted its current calls it has changed format several times, from CHR to Hot Adult Contemporary to Rock Adult Contemporary (as "Rockin' Hits 100.5") to the current classic hits sound.

On Friday February 10, 2012, WKXA announced that they will be switching back to their original Country format on Tuesday February 14, 2012.  Their callsign will be "Your Country Now, 100.5 WKXA"

WKXA is sometimes referred to on-air simply as "KXA."

References

External links

Hancock County, Ohio
Country radio stations in the United States
KXA-FM